

The Kamov Ka-118 is a projected light multirole helicopter with the NOTAR (NO TAil Rotor) configuration based on the McDonnell Douglas design.

Design and development

The first test of this concept took place on the Ka-26SS helicopter, a modified version of the Ka-26 equipped with experimental tail jet beams. The main concept of the Ka-118 features a single 4-blade main rotor, V-tail with upper tailplane, and a skid undercarriage. Pilot and copilot seated in side-by-side configuration, and four passengers in the rear cabin.

Since 1993, engine has not been selected and the NOTAR design is still in research.

Specifications (as designed)

References

Bill Gunston "The Osprey's Encyclopedia of Russian Aircraft", 2000

External links
 www.armscontrol.ru

Kamov aircraft
Soviet and Russian helicopters
Proposed aircraft of Russia
NOTAR helicopters